

C
 CA   - Chesapeake and Albemarle Railroad
 CABU - Bacardi and Company, Ltd.
 CABX - Cabot Corporation
 CACV - Cooperstown and Charlotte Valley Railroad
 CACZ - Comacasa Line
 CAD  - Cadiz Railroad
 CADX - Cando Corporation
 CAEG - Coffeen and Western Railroad (subsidiary of Ameren)
 CAFU - Bay Cities Leasing Company
 CAGX - MHC, Inc. (subsidiary of ConAgra)
 CAGY - Columbus and Greenville Railway
 CAGZ - Columbus and Greenville Railway
 CALA - Carolina Southern Railroad
 CALX - California Railcar Corporation
 CAMX - Canamax Commodity Corporation
 CANX - CANAC International, Inc.
 CAOX - Westlake CA and O
 CAPX - TransAlta Utilities Corporation
 CARR - Carrollton Railroad
 CARX - Carlon; Lamson and Sessions
 CARZ - Anton Caraton and Son
 CASO - Canada Southern Railway; New York Central Railroad; Penn Central; Canadian Pacific Railway
 CATU - CATU Containers, SA
 CAXU - Container Applications International, Inc.
 CBC  - Carbon County Railway; Chemin de fer Baie des Chaleurs
 CBCX - Colonial Brick Company, Inc.
 CBGR - Council Bluffs Railway; Great Western Railway of Iowa
 CBHU - China Ocean Shipping Company
 CBIU - Combi Line-Lash
 CBIX - Central Bi-Products
 CBL  - Conemaugh and Black Lick Railroad
 CBLU - Cooper Brothers Containers, Ltd.
 CBNS - Cape Breton and Central Nova Scotia Railway
 CBPU - CBSL Transportation Services, Ltd.
 CBQ  - Chicago, Burlington and Quincy Railroad; Burlington Northern Railway; Burlington Northern and Santa Fe Railway; BNSF Railway
 CBQZ - Chicago, Burlington and Quincy Railroad; Burlington Northern Railway; Burlington Northern and Santa Fe Railway; BNSF Railway
 CBRM - Chillicothe-Brunswick Rail Maintenance Authority
 CBRW - Columbia Basin Railroad
 CBRX - Charles Barthoid
 CBRY - Copper Basin Railway
 CBTX - Central Bi-Products
 CBYN - Crosbyton Railway
 CC   - Chicago Central and Pacific Railroad
 CCAX - FDJ Leasing
 CCBX - Union Carbide Corporation
 CCC - Clinchfield Coal Corporation
 CCCL - Connecticut Central Railroad
 CCCU - Compass Container Company, Inc.
 CCCX - Carondelet Coke Corporation
 CCCZ - Compass Container Company, Inc.
 CCDX - Dayton Power and Light Company
 CCET - Cincinnati East Terminal Railway
 CCEZ - Chicago Central and Pacific Railroad
 CCFG - Chemin de fer Gaspésie
 CCFZ - Chi-Can Freight Forwarding
 CCGX - Cando Contracting, Ltd. 
 CCHX - Columbian Chemicals Canada, Ltd.
 CCIM - Corpus Christi Terminal Railroad
 CCIX - Stauffer Chemical Company (Consolidated Chemical Division)
 CCIZ - Crete Intermodal
 CCKX - California Contemporary, Inc.; CCKX, Inc.
 CCKY - Chattooga and Chickamauga Railway
 CCLU - Char Ching Shipping (USA), Ltd.
 CCLX - Crystal Car Lines
 CCMX - Calcium Carbonate Company
 CCPR - Chelatchie Prairie Railroad
 CCPX - Canadian Chemical Producers
 CCQX - Construction Carrier, Inc.
 CCR  - Corinth and Counce Railroad; Kansas City Southern Railway
 CCRA - Camp Chase Industrial Railroad
 CCRR - Claremont Concord Railroad
 CCRU - Compagnie Des Containers Reservoir
 CCRX - Coastal Refining and Marketing, Inc.
 CCRY - Charles City Railway
 CCRZ - Kansas City Southern Railway
 CCSU - Trans Ocean, Ltd.
 CCT  - Central California Traction Company
 CCTU - Coordinated Caribbean Transport, Inc.
 CCTX - Central Power and Light Company
 CCTZ - Crowley Maritime Corporation
 CCUO - Chicago-Chemung Railroad
 CCWX - Coastal Chem, Inc.
 CCX  - Columbian Chemicals Company
 CCXU - Char Ching Shipping (USA), Ltd.
 CCXX - Costain Coal, Inc.
 CDAC - Canadian American Railroad; Bangor and Aroostook Railroad; Montreal, Maine and Atlantic
 CDAU - Canadian Tire Corporation Ltd.
 CDAZ - Canadian Tire Corporation Ltd.
 CDCX - Air Liquide America Corporation
 CDGX - Carolinas Domestic Gas Company, Inc.; Chatham Oil Company
 CDHX - Caledonian Rail Lines, LLC
 CDLZ - Cardinal Freight Carriers
 CDNU - Carotrans International
 CDPX - Chevron USA, Inc.
 CDTX - California Department of Transportation (Amtrak California)
 CDVX - Caddo Valley Railcar Repair, Inc.
 CEBX - Combustion Engineering, Inc.
 CEDR - Cedar River Railroad
 CEFX - CIT Group
 CEI  - Chicago and Eastern Illinois Railroad; Missouri Pacific Railroad; Union Pacific Railroad
 CEIW - Central Indiana and Western Railroad
 CELX - Celtran, Inc.
 CEMR - Central Manitoba Railway
 CEMX - Cementos Mexicanos, SA; Cemex Mexico, SA de CV
 CENX - Western Aggregates, Inc.
 CEPX - Cajun Electric Power Cooperative, Inc.; Trinity Industries Leasing
 CERA - Central Railroad Company of Indianapolis
 CERX - Carpenter Chemical Company; ER Carpenter, LLP
 CETU - Custom Environmental Transport, Inc.
 CEWX - Canadian Enterprise Gas Products
 CF   - Cape Fear Railway
 CFC  - Chemin de fer Charlevoix
 CFE  - Chicago, Fort Wayne and Eastern
 CFKZ - XTRA Intermodal
 CFL  - Chemin de fer Lanaudière
 CFLX - Crestbrook Forest Industries
 CFM  - Chemin de fer de Matapédia et du Golfe
 CFMG - Chemin de Fer de Matapédia et Gaspésie
 CFMX - Cargill, Inc.
 CFNR - California Northern Railroad
 CFO  - Ottawa Central Railway
 CFPX - GE Railcar Services Corporation
 CFQC - Quebec Central Railway
 CFRR - Chemin de fer Rivière Romaine
 CFRU - Cardinal Freight Carriers
 CFS  - Sartigan Railway
 CFSX - C and T Refinery, Inc.
 CFTX - Canadian Fertilizers, Ltd.
 CFWR - Caney Fork and Western Railway
 CG   - Central of Georgia Railway; Norfolk Southern Railway
 CGA  - Central of Georgia Railway; Norfolk Southern Railway
 CGAX - Cargill, Inc. (C.G.D. Division)
 CGBX - Procor, Ltd.; Dow Chemical Canada, Inc.
 CGCX - Continental Grain Company
 CGDX - Country Gas Distributors, Inc.; Eastern Propane Gas
 CGEX - Canadian General Electric Company, Ltd.; Cargill, Inc.
 CGFX - Consolidated Gas Company of Florida
 CGLX - Canadian General Transit; General American Train Company
 CGMU - Compagnie Generale Maritime
 CGMX - GATX Rail Canada Corporation
 CGMZ - Compagnie Generale Maritime
 CGNE - Champagne Railroad, Inc.
 CGOX - Cargill, Inc.
 CGR  - CG Railway
 CGRX - Consolidated Grain and Barge Company
 CGRY - Carrizo Gorge Railway, Inc.
 CGSX - Proflame Incorporated
 CGT  - Canada and Gulf Terminal Railway
 CGTU - Compagnie Generale Maritime
 CGTX - Canadian General Transit; General American Train Company
 CGW  - Chicago Great Western Railway; Chicago and North Western Railway; Union Pacific Railroad
 CHAT - Chattahoochee and Gulf Railroad
 CHAU - Combined Transport Group, Inc.
 CHAX - Chartrand's Tank Car Service, Inc.
 CHEX - Chemplex Company; Equistar Chemicals
 CHFU - Challenge International
 CHH  - Cheswick and Harmar
 CHIU - Chimco - Bulgaria
 CHLX - Chemleco, Inc.
 CHMX - C. H. Masland and Sons; First Union Rail
 CHOX - Sugar Express
 CHP  - Ferrocarril de Chihuahua al Pacifico, SA de CV; Ferrocarriles Nacionales de Mexico
 CHR  - Chestnut Ridge Railway
 CHRC - Chaparral Railroad
 CHRR - Chesapeake Railroad
 CHRX - Chesapeake Railway Association; previously the Chesapeake Division, Railroad Enthusiasts, Inc. until 1 Dec 1999.
 CHS  - Charlotte Southern Railroad
 CHSX - Cenex Harvest States Cooperative
 CHSZ - Intermodal Services, Inc.
 CHTS - Penn Eastern Rail Lines, Inc.
 CHTT - Chicago Heights Terminal Transfer Railroad; Missouri Pacific Railroad; Union Pacific Railroad
 CHV  - Chattahoochee Valley Railway
 CHVX - Chevron Chemical Company
 CHW  - Chesapeake Western Railway; Norfolk Southern
 CI   - Cambria and Indiana Railroad
 CIBX - The CIT Group, Capital Finance, Inc
 CIC  - Cedar Rapids and Iowa City Railway (Crandic)
 CIIX - Contico International, Inc.
 CIM  - Chicago and Illinois Midland Railway
 CIND - Central Railroad Company of Indiana
 CIPX - Central Illinois Public Service Company; Ameren Energy Generating Company
 CIR  - City of Rochelle, Illinois
 CIRR - Chattahoochee Industrial Railroad
 CIRX - Consbec, Inc.
 CIRY - Central Illinois Railroad
 CISD - Colonel's Island Railroad
 CITU - Citroen
 CITX - PLM International
 CIW  - Illinois Central Gulf; Illinois Central Railroad; Canadian National Railway
 CIXX - Calciner Industries, Inc.
 CJPX - General Electric Rail Services Corporation
 CKIN - Chesapeake and Indiana Railroad
 CKIX - C.K. Industries
 CKP  - Colorado Kansas and Pacific Railway
 CKRY - Kansas and Oklahoma Railroad
 CKSI - Carthage Knightstown and Shirley Railroad
 CLC  - Columbia and Cowlitz Railway
 CLCO - Claremont and Concord Railway
 CLCX - Union Oil Company of California; Chattahoochee Locomotive Company
 CLCZ - Complete Logistics Company
 CLDZ - Celadon Trucking Services, Inc.
 CLEX - Chemical Enterprises, Inc.; Cieco Corporation
 CLGR - Central Louisiana and Gulf Railroad
 CLGU - Costa Line Cargo Services
 CLIF - Cliffside Railroad
 CLIX - Calumet Lubricants
 CLK  - Cadillac and Lake City Railway
 CLMX - Consolidated Thompson Iron Mines Limited
 CLNA - Carolina Coastal Railway
 CLOU - CLOU Container Leasing, GmbH
 CLOX - Clark Refining and Marketing, Inc.
 CLP  - Clarendon and Pittsford Railroad
 CLPX - Boulder Scientific Company
 CLPZ - Clarendon and Pittsford Railroad
 CLRX - Clayton Rail
 CLSL - Columbia and Silver Creek Railroad
 CLSX - Cargill (Salt Division)
 CLTU - Chemical Leaman Tank Lines, Inc.
 CLTX - Cloro de Tehuantepec, SA de CV
 CM   - Central Montana Rail
 CMBU - CMB, SA
 CMC  - CMC Railroad, Inc.
 CMCU - Crowley Maritime Corporation
 CMCX - Sweetman Construction Company
 CMCZ - Crowley Maritime Corporation
 CMDX - Cargill, Inc.
 CMER - Curtis, Milburn and Eastern Railroad
 CMEX - CEMEX, Inc.
 CMG  - Chicago, Milwaukee and Gary Railway
 CMGN - Central Michigan Railway
 CMHX - CarMath, Inc.
 CMIX - Consolidated Minerals, Inc.
 CMLU - Containers Marine Lines (Division of American Export Lines)
 CMLX - Craggy Mountain Line, Inc.
 CMLZ - Containers Marine Lines Isbrandtsen
 CMMU - Medcontainers
 CMO  - Chicago, St. Paul, Minneapolis and Omaha Railway; Chicago and North Western Railway; Union Pacific Railroad
 CMPA - Madison Railroad Division of City of Madison Port Authority
 CMPU - Complete Logistics Company
 CMQ  - Central Maine and Quebec Railway
 CMR  - Central Midland Railway Company
 CMSX - Cape May Seashore Lines
 CMSN - Crowley Marine Services
 CMU  - Columbus Charter Service
 CMUU - Canada Maritime Agencies Limited
 CMWX - Chateau Martin Wine
 CN   - Canadian National Railway
 CNA  - Canadian National Railway
 CNAZ - Grand Trunk Western Railroad; Canadian National Railway
 CNCX - Columbia Nitrogen Corporation
 CNDX - Connecticut Department of Transportation
 CNE  - Central New England Railway; New York, New Haven and Hartford Railroad
 CNEU - Canadian National Railway
 CNEZ - Canadian National Railway
 CNGU - Sicng (Ind. Chim. Du Nord de la Grece SA)
 CNGX - CONAG Finance, Inc.
 CNHX - Ontario Hydro; Ontario Power Generation
 CNIS - Canadian National Railway
 CNJ  - Central Railroad of New Jersey; Norfolk Southern
 CNL  - Columbia, Newberry and Laurens Railroad; Atlantic Coast Line Railroad; CSX Transportation
 CNLX - CANAC International
 CNMZ - Norfolk Southern
 CNNU - Compania Nacional de Nabegacao
 CNOR - Cincinnati Northern
 CNOW - Columbia and Northern Railway
 CNOX - Shell Canada, Ltd.
 CNPU - Canadian National Railway
 CNPZ - Canadian National Railway
 CNQ  - Canadian National Railway End Of Train Devices
 CNRR - California Northern Railroad
 CNRU - Canadian National Railway
 CNRX - Canadian National Railway
 CNRZ - Canadian National Railway
 CNSX - Consolidated Oil and Transportation Company, Inc.
 CNTP - Cincinnati, New Orleans and Texas Pacific Railway
 CNTX - Continental Tank Car Corporation
 CNUR - C&NC Railroad
 CNVX - Convoyeur National, Inc.
 CNW  - Chicago and North Western Railway; Union Pacific Railroad
 CNWS - Chicago and North Western Railway
 CNWX - Canadian Wheat Board
 CNWZ - Chicago and North Western Railway; Union Pacific Railroad
 CNYK - Central New York Railroad
 CNYX - Central New York Locomotive Company
 CNZR - Central New England Railroad
 CO   - Chesapeake and Ohio Railway; Chessie System; CSX Transportation
 COAX - Trinity Rail Management, Inc.
 COBX - Cobre Mining Company, Ltd.
 COCX - Chevron Oronite Company LLC
 COE  - Colorado and Eastern Railroad
 COEH - Conecuh Valley Railroad
 COER - Crab Orchard and Egyptian Railroad
 COEZ - Crab Orchard and Egyptian Railroad
 COLX - Alliant Energy
 COMX - Commonwealth Edison Company
 CONU - Contrans
 CONX - Conoco Inc.
 COOK - Cook Transit
 COOX - Cooperative Producers, Inc.; First Union Rail
 COP  - City of Prineville Railway
 COPX - CanadianOxy Industrial Chemicals, LP
 CORP - Central Oregon and Pacific Railroad
 CORU - CATU Containers, SA
 CORX - Coors Brewing Company
 COSU - China Ocean Steamship, Ltd.
 COSX - Cabot Corporation (CAB-O-SIL Division)
 COTX - Consolidated Transportation Corporation; GLNX Corporation
 COZ  - CSX Transportation
 CP   - Canadian Pacific Railway
 CPAA - Canadian Pacific Railway
 CPAX - CITGO Petroleum Corporation
 CPBU - Soo Line; Canadian Pacific Railway
 CPBZ - Soo Line; Canadian Pacific Railway
 CPCX - Chevron Phillips Chemical Company
 CPDR - South Carolina Central Railroad (Carolina Piedmont Division); Carolina Piedmont Railway
 CPDU - Delaware and Hudson Railway
 CPDX - Chevron USA, Inc.
 CPDZ - Delaware and Hudson Railway
 CPGZ - ContainerPort Group, Inc.
 CPHX - Ontario Hydro; Ontario Power Generation
 CPI  - Canadian Pacific Railway
 CPIX - Continental Polymers, Inc.; ICI Acrylics, Inc.
 CPLJ - Camp Lejeune Railroad
 CPLT - Camino, Placerville and Lake Tahoe Railroad
 CPLX - CPLX Leasing
 CPMY - Coopersville and Marne Railway
 CPOX - Consumers Power Company
 CPPU - Canadian Pacific Railway
 CPPX - Consolidated Papers, Inc.
 CPPZ - Canadian Pacific Railway
 CPRS - Canadian Pacific Railway
 CPRX - Carolina Power and Light Company
 CPRZ - Canadian Pacific Railway
 CPSX - Commercial Plastics Systems, Inc.
 CPSU - CP Ships
 CPT  - Canadian Pacific Railway End Of Train Devices
 CPVU - Containers and Pressure Vessels, Ltd.
 CPWX - Canadian Wheat Board
 CQPA - Central Columbiana and Pennsylvania Railway
 CR   - Norfolk Southern
 CRAX - Crystal Hopper Associates
 CRAZ - Cornucopia Transportation, Inc.
 CRCR - Crete Carrier Corporation
 CRCX - Conrail Shared Assets Operations - Legal Name: Conrail
 CRCZ - Norfolk Southern
 CRDX - Chicago Freight Car Leasing Company
 CREU - Canadian Retail Shippers Association
 CREX - Merchants Investment Company; Citicorp Railmark, Inc.
 CREZ - Canadian Retail Shippers Association
 CRGX - Cargill, Inc.
 CRIJ - Carolina Rail Services, Inc.
 CRIX - GE Railcar Services Corporation; Citicorp Railmark, Inc.
 CRL  - Chicago Rail Link
 CRLE - Coe Rail, Inc.
 CRLU - Carlisle Leasing International
 CRLX - Canadian Railserve, Ltd.
 CRMU - Norfolk Southern
 CRMX - The Cropmate Company
 CRMZ - Norfolk Southern
 CRN  - Carolina and Northwestern Railway; Norfolk Southern
 CROX - Sylvachem Corporation
 CRP  - Central Railroad of Pennsylvania; Norfolk Southern
 CRPU - Norfolk Southern
 CRPX - Centennial Gas Liquids
 CRQU - Norfolk Southern
 CRR  - Clinchfield Railroad; Seaboard System Railroad; CSX Transportation
 CRRR - Copper Range Refrigerator
 CRRX - Cañon City and Royal Gorge Railroad, LLC
 CRSX - Cost Rail Service
 CRTZ - Norfolk Southern
 CRXU - Cronos Containers (UK)
 CRYX - Cryo-Trans, Inc.
 CRZ  - Norfolk Southern
 CS   - Colorado and Southern Railway; Burlington Northern Railway; Burlington Northern and Santa Fe Railway; BNSF Railway
 CSAU - Costa Line
 CSBX - Cargill (Salt Division)
 CSCD - Cascade and Columbia River Railroad
 CSCX - Oglebay Norton; Coal Supply Corporation
 CSDX - Metropolitan Water Reclamation District of Greater Chicago
 CSGX - Central Sand and Gravel Company
 CSKR - C and S Railroad
 CSKU - Consolidated Services, Inc.
 CSL  - Chicago Short Line Railway
 CSMX - Carol and Andy Muller
 CSNX - Cities Service Oil and Gas Corporation; Trident NGL, Inc.
 CSO  - Connecticut Southern Railroad
 CSOR - Connecticut Southern Railroad
 CSOX - CITGO Petroleum Corporation
 CSP  - Camas Prairie RailNet
 CSPX - Chesapeake Speciality Products; Cities Service Company
 CSRX - Conway Scenic Railroad
 CSRZ - CSX Transportation
 CSS  - Chicago South Shore and South Bend Railroad
 CSTX - Canadian Starch Company (Casco)
 CSUX - City of Colorado Springs Department of Electric Generation
 CSVU - Compania Sud Americana de Vapores, GmbH
 CSWX - Central and South West Services, Inc.
 CSX  - Central Transportation Company, Inc.
 CSXE - CSX Transportation End Of Train Devices
 CSXT - CSX Transportation
 CSXU - CSX Transportation
 CSXZ - CSX Transportation
 CSYX - Central Soya
 CT   - Columbia Terminal Railroad
 CTCU - Container Trading Company
 CTCX - GE Railcar Services Corporation; Endasa, SA de CV
 CTE  - Cen-Tex Rail Link
 CTEU - Spanish Lines
 CTEX - Canterra Energy, Ltd.; PLM International, Inc.
 CTGZ - Combined Transport Group, Inc.
 CTIE - Kansas City Southern Railway
 CTIU - CTI-Container Transport International, Inc.
 CTIX - Southeastern Industrial Enterprises, Inc.
 CTIZ - CTI-Container Transport International, Inc.
 CTKU - Container Tank Services, Ltd.
 CTLX - Endasa, SA de CV
 CTML - Cairo Terminal Railroad
 CTN  - Canton Railroad
 CTNX - Continental Carbon
 CTOU - Chem-Rail Logistics, LLC
 CTPX - Certain Teed Corporation; Courtesy Corporation
 CTR  - Clinton Terminal Railroad; Carlton Trail Railway
 CTRN - Central of Tennessee Railway and Navigation Company
 CTRR - Cloquet Terminal Railroad
 CTRU - Container Trading Company
 CTRW - Carlton Trail Railway
 CTRX - C and T Refinery, Inc.
 CTSU - Bibby Bros Company
 CTSX - CTS Cement Manufacturing, Inc. (Chem Comp Systems)
 CTSZ - Carotrans International
 CTTX - Trailer Train Company; TTX Company
 CTUU - Container Trading Company
 CTVX - Cleveland Terminal and Valley Railway
 CTWU - Container Trading Company
 CTZZ - Continental Transportation Company
 CUEX - Colorado-Utility Electric Association
 CUOH - Columbus and Ohio River Rail Road
 CURB - Curtis Bay Railroad
 CUST - Chicago Union Station Company
 CUT  - Cincinnati Union Terminal
 CUVA - Cuyahoga Valley Railway; ISG Cleveland Works Railway
 CV   - Central Vermont Railway; Grand Trunk Western; Canadian National Railway
 CVC  - Central Vermont Railway; Canadian National Railway
 CVQ  - Grand Trunk Western Railroad; Canadian National Railway
 CVR  - Cimarron Valley Railroad
 CVRX - Locomotive and Tower Preservation Fund, Ltd.
 CVRY - Caddo Valley Railroad
 CVRZ - Grand Trunk Western Railroad; Canadian National Railway
 CVSR - Cuyahoga Valley Scenic Railroad
 CVYR - Caddo Valley Railroad
 CW   - Colorado and Wyoming Railway
 CWBX - C. W. Brooks, Inc.
 CWCX - Canandaigua Wine Company, Inc.
 CWCY - Caldwell County Railroad
 CWEX - Commonwealth Edison Company; Midwest Generation, LLC
 CWI  - Chicago and Western Indiana Railroad
 CWIU - Con-Way Intermodal
 CWIZ - Con-Way Intermodal
 CWMX - Chemical Waste Management, Inc.
 CWP  - Chicago, West Pullman and Southern Railroad; Chicago Rail Link
 CWR  - California Western Railroad; CWR, Inc.
 CWRC - Central Wisconsin Railroad
 CWRL - Central Western Railway
 CWRO - Cleveland Works Railway
 CWRY - Commonwealth Railway
 CWRZ - Providence and Worcester Railroad
 CWSX - USS Fabrication Division (United States Steel Corporation)
 CWTX - ChemWest Industries, Inc.
 CWTZ - Con-Way Truckload Services
 CXCZ - CSX Lines, LLC
 CXIX - Chemical Exchange Industries, Inc.
 CXPZ - CSX Transportation
 CXRZ - CSX Transportation
 CXVZ - CSX Intermodal, Inc.
 CYCY - Crystal City Railroad
 CYDX - Conrad Yelvington Distributors, Inc.
 CYTX - Construcciones Y Trituaraciones, SA de CV
 CYX  - American Cyanamid Company
 CZ   - Coahuila and Zacatecas Railway
 CZCX - Crown Zellerbach Corporation
 CZRY - Carrizo Gorge Railway

References 

C